WJZF-LP (97.1 FM) was a radio station licensed to Standish, Maine, United States. The station was owned by Standish Citizens Educational Organization. The station was heard on public-access television cable TV channels in Gorham and Saco.

History
Standish Citizens Educational Organization became an organization in May 2002 and applied for a construction permit for a new LPFM station. The station was granted the WJZF-LP on 2003-12-29, and the station went on the air January 20, 2005, primarily focusing on smooth jazz, however having specialty shows including oldies, blues and old time radio. WJZF-LP also broadcast worldwide on www.wjzf.org and on www.tunein.com, which draws listeners from all corners of the globe.

The station's license was cancelled by the Federal Communications Commission on August 27, 2019, due to the station having been silent since April 27, 2018.

WJZF was the former call sign of a smooth jazz radio station in the Atlanta, Georgia area now known as WALR-FM. This station identified as "Jazz Flavors 104.1." WJZF-LP also billed its smooth jazz programming as "Smooth Jazz Flavors."

References

External links
 

JZF-LP
JZF-LP
Standish, Maine
Radio stations established in 2005
2005 establishments in Maine
Defunct radio stations in the United States
Radio stations disestablished in 2019
2019 disestablishments in Maine
JZF-LP
Defunct community radio stations in the United States